Giannandrea Giustiniani Longo (Genoa, 1494 - Genoa, 1554) was the 51st Doge of the Republic of Genoa.

Biography 
Before becoming the Doge of the republic, Longo held the official positions of Magistrate of the war, senator and procurator of the Republic.

He was elected doge on 4 January 1539, succeeding Giovanni Battista Doria, the sixth in biennial succession and the 51st in republican history. During the dogate he worked in particular to alleviate the consequences of the famine that had hit the city, establishing among other things the Magistrate of Mercy and granting benefits to the pawnshop. He was responsible for the construction of the Porta d'Archi, now remembered by the street that bears the same name. The mandate ended on 4 January 1541, upon its expiry.

He married Maddalena Banca, with whom he had two daughters. He died around 1554 in Genoa and was buried in the church of Santa Maria di Castello, however, his grave was destroyed during the French bombing of the city in 1684.

See also 

 Doge of Genoa
 Republic of Genoa

References 

1494 births
1554 deaths
16th-century Doges of Genoa